Francis Meredyth Whitehouse (October 2, 1848 - March 8, 1938) also known as F. M. Whitehouse was an architect from Chicago Illinois.

Early life
Francis Meredyth Whitehouse was born in New York city on October 2, 1848. His father was Episcopal bishop Henry John Whitehouse. He studied architecture at the University of Gottingen in Germany.

Career

Whitehouse began his career as a draftsman for architect Edward Burling. He later became a junior partner in the firm. He helped design the Epiphany Episcopal Church in Chicago and the First National Bank Building. In 1889 he left the partnership and started his own firm. Whitehouse designed many mansion-type homes in the Chicago area especially on Lake Drive. He designed the Choral Building (Festival Hall) for the 1893 World's Columbian Exposition in Chicago.

Personal
He was married to Mary née Armour and they had a son named Meredyth. Whitehouse enjoyed yachting and spent time at one of his estates in Manchester, Massachusetts. He died in Winter Park Florida on March 8, 1938.

References

External links
Francis Meredyth Whitehouse at find a grave

1848 births
1938 deaths
19th-century architects
20th-century architects